TTG may refer to:

Medicine, science and technology 
Tissue transglutaminase (tTG), an enzyme
Tonalite-trondhjemite-granodiorite, a type of rock
Transmit/receive transition gap in communications
TTG, a codon for the amino acid Leucine

Video, arts and culture 
TTG Studios,  Los Angeles, US

Other 
Travel Trade Gazette
Tarun The Great
Teen Titans Go!